Confessions of a Nazi Spy is a 1939 American spy political thriller film directed by Anatole Litvak for Warner Bros. It was the first explicitly anti-Nazi film to be produced by a major Hollywood studio, being released in May 1939, four months before the beginning of World War II and two and a half years before the United States' entry into the war.

The film stars Edward G. Robinson, Francis Lederer, George Sanders, Paul Lukas, and a large cast of German actors, including some who had emigrated from their country after the rise of Adolf Hitler. Many of the German actors who appeared in the film changed their names for fear of reprisals against relatives still living in Germany.

The film's story is based on a series of articles by FBI officer Leon G. Turrou, recounting his investigation of Nazi spy rings in the United States. Parts of the film are drawn from the Rumrich Nazi spy case, the first major international espionage case in American history.

Plot
A silhouetted narrator connects the film to recent events, beginning in a quiet corner of Scotland in 1937: The postman asks Mrs. MacLaughlin for stamps from the letters she receives from all over the world. MacLaughlin forwards the contents of one envelope to Dr. Karl Kassel in New York City. Cut to Kassel haranguing an audience of German-Americans at the Café Nuremberg.  Most are wearing the uniform of the German American Bund.

The Führer has declared war on the evils of democracy and as Germans, they should carry out his wishes and claim power. The crowd salutes, "Sieg Heil!"

Kurt Schneider, an unemployed malcontent, is inspired to become a spy and writes to Hitler's personal newspaper. German Naval Intelligence knows that he is not a double agent because the Americans have no formal counterespionage system. Franz Schlager, a naval officer sailing to New York on the steamship Bismarck, is ordered to contact Schneider.

On board the Bismarck, the power of the Gestapo is shown. Beauty operator Hilda Kleinhauer informs on her clients and carries material for Schlager.

An American Legionaire challenges Kassel at a meeting. He and others speaking out for democracy are attacked.

Schneider boasts to his friend Werner, a private in the Air Corps, that he receives instructions from Hitler. Werner gets the Z code, and Schneider obtains medical records that will reveal troop strength in New York. Schneider proudly gives Schlager the information and receives $50 a month, Mrs. MacLaughlin's address, and a list of new objectives.

Kassel is called back to Germany.  He takes his mistress, Erika Wolff, and leaves his wife behind. The narrator provides a dramatic description of the fascist way of life. Kassel is put in charge of all Nazi activities in the United States. Under the slogan, "America for Americans," the country is swamped by propaganda while spies target military operations.

Thanks to the postman's curiosity, British Military Intelligence uncovers Mrs. MacLaughlin's role as postmistress for a worldwide network of spies. (In a moment that is chilling in hindsight, one letter is from Japan.) American military intelligence in New York consists of Major Williams and one assistant. Williams turns to the FBI for help, although it has never played that role before. FBI Agent Ed Renard takes the case.

Kassel visits Camp Horst Wessel, where German-American children are trained in Nazi ideals and military skills.

Schneider uses an alias to obtain passports, arousing suspicion. The FBI follows the package and arrests him. Knowing his true identity, they realize that they have a letter that he sent to MacLaughlin. Renard flatters his ego for hours and extracts a detailed confession. Through Schneider, Renard finds Wenz, Kleinhauer and Kassel. Kassel proudly shows Renard his files on important Americans that document racial impurity. He tries to burn the code key, but Renard stops him. Renard confronts him with Kleinhauer, who confirms his link with Schlager.

When Renard reveals that he knows about Erika, Kassel confesses everything about the German spy organization, revealing the intricacy and scope of the network. He is released, and the Gestapo are waiting. He swears that he revealed nothing, but the men are arrested outside his apartment building.

A federal dragnet captures many agents and their accomplices. On March 13, 1938, Hitler annexes Austria. Renard warns Kassell's wife that the Gestapo men have made bail. Karl returns home from meeting Erika and lies to his wife. He packs, refusing to take her with him. She does not warn him.  The Gestapo capture him and take him to the Bismarck. In Germany, he is told to claim that he was tortured. In New York, Hilda receives the same instructions.

Eighteen people are indicted. Four are in custody: Schneider, Wenz, Kleinhauer and Helldorf. US Attorney Kellogg describes the role of fifth columnists in the Nazi conquest of Europe and calls for the United States to take a lesson, reviewing Hitler's march through Europe,  as a  demonstration of “the supremacy of organized propaganda backed by force.” The spies are convicted. 

Over coffee, Kellogg and Renard discuss the “insanity." Kellogg believes that "when our basic liberties are threatened, we wake up."

The credits roll to America the Beautiful, in march time.

Cast

Casting notes 
Several actors in the film were expatriates from Germany and other European countries living in the United States, some of whom had moved to flee Nazi oppression. To prevent retaliation against their relatives still living in Germany, many appeared in the film uncredited or under aliases. These actors were Hedwiga Reicher ('Celia Sibelius'), Wolfgang Zilzer ('John Voigt'), Rudolph Anders ('Robert Davis'), Wilhelm von Brincken ('William Vaughn'), and Martin Kosleck (uncredited).

Production
Screenwriter John Wexley based his script on real events and the articles of former FBI agent Leon G. Turrou, who had been active in investigating Nazi spy rings in the United States prior to the war, and lost his position at the Bureau when he published the articles without permission.  Authors Paul Buhle and David Wagner of Radical Hollywood wrote that it "treated a real-life case" and that Warner Bros. had been warned by the Dies Committee "against slurring a 'friendly country'".

Parts of the movie were a fictionalized account of a real-life espionage case, the Rumrich Nazi Spy Case, and the eventual trial in 1938 involving individuals convicted of spying for German government. The FBI says Rumrich Nazi Spy Case was their "first major international spy case" and that Leon Turrou "was placed in charge" and eventually fired. Guenther Gustave Maria Rumrich was arrested on February 14, 1938, and charged with spying for Germany.  He came to the FBI's attention when he attempted to obtain 50 passport application forms from the Passport Office in New York City.  In the film, Francis Lederer, as Schneider, plays the role equivalent to the real Rumrich.

The scene where an unnamed American Legionaire played by Ward Bond challenges Kassel at a meeting, is supported by others speaking out for democracy, provoking an attack by Bundists, is based on an actual event that occurred in late April 1938. when approximately 30 World War I American Legion Veterans stood up to the Bund in New York City during a celebration of Hitler's birthday.  The veterans were severely beaten and later Cecil Schubert, who suffered a fractured skull, was personally recognized for his bravery by Mayor La Guardia.
 
The film was the first anti-Nazi film from a major American studio. At the premier, there were almost as many policemen and special agents in the audience as customers. Wexley's script made a point of following the facts and real-life events of the Rumrich Nazi Spy Case whose participants went to trial in 1938.

Reception and ban
The film failed at the box office.  Nonetheless, it won the 1939 National Board of Review Award for Best Film. The film was re-released in 1940 with scenes describing events that had taken place since the initial release, such as the invasions of Norway and the Netherlands. Scenes from Confessions of a Nazi Spy are shown in War Comes to America, the last of the Why We Fight propaganda film series, as well as the 2004 documentary film Imaginary Witness: Hollywood and the Holocaust.

Confessions of a Nazi Spy was banned in Germany, Japan, and many Latin American and European countries. Norway also banned it in 1939. Adolf Hitler in particular banned all Warner Bros. productions from being shown in Nazi Germany as a result of the studio's work on the film.

See also
 1939 Nazi rally at Madison Square Garden
 Duquesne Spy Ring – 1941 case
 Confusions of a Nutzy Spy
 The Stranger (1946) – another film with an anti-Nazi theme also starring Edward G. Robinson

Notes

External links

 
 
 
 
 Confessions of a Nazi Spy: Warner Bros.,  Anti-Fascism and the Politicization of Hollywood at The Norman Lear Center

1939 films
1930s spy thriller films
American black-and-white films
American spy thriller films
American propaganda films
1930s English-language films
Anti-fascist propaganda films
Films about the Federal Bureau of Investigation
Films based on non-fiction books
Films directed by Anatole Litvak
Films produced by Hal B. Wallis
Films scored by Max Steiner
Spy films based on actual events
Warner Bros. films
World War II spy films
Films set in Scotland
Films set in New York City
Seafaring films
American World War II films
1930s American films
Film censorship in Norway
Film censorship in Japan